Gerard Langner (born 15 February 1943) is a Polish former ice hockey player. He played for Start Katowice, Baildon Katowice, and Legia Warsaw during his career. He also played for the Polish national team at the 1964 Winter Olympics.

References

External links
 

1943 births
Living people
Baildon Katowice players
Ice hockey players at the 1964 Winter Olympics
Legia Warsaw (ice hockey) players
Olympic ice hockey players of Poland
Polish ice hockey defencemen
Sportspeople from Katowice